Ralph Clayton Kopak (April 26, 1924 in Edmonton, Alberta – November 25, 1998) was a Canadian ice hockey player who played 24 games in the National Hockey League with the Boston Bruins during the 1943–44 season. The rest of his career, which lasted from 1943 to 1950, was spent in different minor leagues.

Career statistics

Regular season and playoffs

External links

1924 births
1998 deaths
Boston Bruins players
Boston Olympics players
Canadian ice hockey centres
Fort Worth Rangers players
Seattle Ironmen players
Ice hockey people from Edmonton